Alexandre Lapandry (born 13 April 1989 in Paray-le-Monial, Saône-et-Loire) is a French rugby union player. Lapandry, who is a flanker, plays his club rugby for ASM Clermont Auvergne. He made his debut for France against Samoa on 21 November 2009.

Lapandry captained the French under-20 team at the 2009 IRB Junior World Championship.

References

External links
 FFR profile 
 ASM Clermont Auvergne profile 

1989 births
Living people
People from Paray-le-Monial
French rugby union players
France international rugby union players
Rugby union flankers
ASM Clermont Auvergne players
Sportspeople from Saône-et-Loire